Chabab Reyadi Baladiyat Ben Badis, known as CRB Ben Badis or CRBBB for short, is an Algerian football club based in Ben Badis, Sid Bel Abbés. The club was founded in 1936 and its colors are green, red and white. Their home stadium, the 1 november Stadium, has a capacity of some 8,000 spectators. The club is currently playing in the Ligue Nationale du Football Amateur.

History

External links
 LNF Profile

Football clubs in Algeria
Association football clubs established in 1946
Oran Province
1946 establishments in Algeria
Sports clubs in Algeria